Motoring (usually appended with the current model year, such as Motoring 2015; sometimes stylized as Motoring TV) is a Canadian television automotive newsmagazine, broadcast by TSN and produced by Bradford Productions. Its debut was in 1987 on TSN as Motoring 88 in a 1/2 hour timeslot. Its motto is, "bringing you stories about cars and the people who drive them."

Synopsis
The program provides reviews and features about new automotive vehicles, including results of test drives.  There are also tips about auto mechanics.

History
Motoring TV premiered on TSN: The Sports Network in the fall of 1987 as Motoring '88 in a 1/2-hour timeslot.

In 2013, Motoring won the Best Video Journalism for Television Broadcast award.

Show series is now off the air with "Motoring 22" as the final season.

See also
 MotorWeek
 Fifth Gear
 Top Gear
 The Grand Tour

References

External links
 Official website: https://motoringtv.com/
 
 
 
 

Automotive television series
The Sports Network original programming
1987 Canadian television series debuts
1980s Canadian sports television series
1990s Canadian sports television series
2000s Canadian sports television series
2010s Canadian sports television series
2020s Canadian sports television series